Rachel Erin Luba (born July 27, 1992) is an American sports agent. She is the founder and owner of Luba Sports, a sports agency based in Maple Valley, Washington. She is also the youngest certified female agent in baseball.

Early and personal life
Luba is a native of Monterey, California. She attended the University of California, Los Angeles (UCLA), where she was a gymnast. Luba graduated magna cum laude a year early in 2013 from UCLA, earning her bachelor's degree in communications. Following her retirement from gymnastics, Luba entered the world of competitive boxing. Luba went on to attend law school at Pepperdine University, graduating a semester early in 2016.

Luba competed on Season 13 of American Ninja Warrior, but failed on the first obstacle.

Career
Luba began her sports agency career as an intern for the Beverly Hills Sports Council while in law school. In 2017, she was hired by the Major League Baseball Players Association as a lawyer, working on over 22 arbitration cases and helping win a record 12 hearings for MLB players in 2018.

Luba founded her own sports agency, Luba Sports, in October 2019. She revealed that in an effort to pay off student debt from law school, she started out working 10- to 14-hour days as the sole employee of the company. Later that year, pitcher Trevor Bauer signed with the company, becoming Luba's first client. Her first negotiations as an agent were between Bauer and the Cincinnati Reds. Luba negotiated the second highest contract for an arbitration-eligible pitcher in MLB history, with Bauer signing a one-year, $17.5 million contract with the Reds.

Bauer went on to win the 2020 NL Cy Young, making Luba the first female in MLB history to represent a Cy Young winner. The following year in the 2020–2021 offseason, Luba helped negotiate a record-breaking deal for Bauer with the Los Angeles Dodgers, earning $40 million in 2021 and $45 million in 2022 and making him the highest paid player in Major League Baseball history in each of those years. Luba's record-breaking deal for her client is the first contract in Major League Baseball to eclipse $40 million in a single season. The contract was also structured with a player opt-out after years 1 and 2. This means a three-year total of $102 million should he choose to opt-in for both 2022 and 2023. In 2021, during the sexual assault allegations against Bauer, Luba faced criticism for defending Bauer and denying the claims, as many felt she was gaslighting the alleged victim, while others supported her for standing up for her client. Following a three-day hearing in which the accuser testified at length and expert witnesses testified and explained that the injuries the accuser alleged were not present in the actual medical reports, the judge found the accuser's initial claims to be "materially misleading" and concluded that no acts of sexual assault occurred.

Luba also represents professional softball player and former UCLA softball catcher Paige Halstead. Additionally, she represents several MLB coaches. All-Star right fielder Yasiel Puig was previously represented by Luba's sports agency from November 2020 to November 2021.

Luba was featured in the 2021 Forbes 30 Under 30 under the sports category.

Luba co-hosts a podcast, Cork'd Up, with Jessica Kleinschmidt. She also runs her own YouTube channel in which she explains the arbitration process, and other jobs of an agent.

References

1992 births
Living people
American lawyers
American sports agents
Sportspeople from Monterey, California
University of California, Los Angeles alumni
Pepperdine University School of Law alumni
Women sports agents
UCLA Bruins women's gymnasts